Nigel David Jones, Baron Jones of Cheltenham (30 March 1948 – 7 November 2022) was a British Liberal Democrat politician who served as a Member of Parliament (MP) from 1992 to 2005, and as a member of the House of Lords from 2005 until his death in 2022.

Early life
Nigel Jones was born in Cheltenham on 30 March 1948. He attended Prince Henry's Grammar School, Evesham. After leaving school, he worked as a computer operator for Westminster Bank from 1965 to 1967, and then as a computer programmer at International Computers Limited (ICL) from 1967 to 1970. From 1970 to 1971, he worked as a systems analyst at Vehicle and General Insurance, and as a systems programmer at Atkins Computing, before he rejoined ICL as a project manager in 1971. From 1989, Jones was a councillor on Gloucestershire County Council. He resigned from both ICL and Gloucestershire County Council in 1992, when he was elected to Parliament.

Parliamentary career
Jones was elected as the Member of Parliament (MP) for Cheltenham at the 1992 general election, winning the seat from the Conservative Party. He had previously contested the seat unsuccessfully at the 1979 general election.

Jones was a member of the public accounts committee from 2002-05. He was also the Liberal Democrat spokesperson for a number of topics, including local government (1992–93), sport science and technology (1993), consumer affairs (1995-97), sport and culture (1997–99), trade and industry (1997–99) and international development (1999). Jones retained the seat until standing down at the 2005 general election.

Attack
On 28 January 2000, a man, later identified as Robert Ashman, entered Jones's constituency office and attacked him and his assistant, local County councillor Andrew Pennington, with a katana. As a result of the attack, Pennington was killed, and Jones was severely injured. Jones required 57 stitches to close wounds to his hand from the assault.

Jones had written a character reference for Ashman when Ashman was nearly jailed after breaking the ribs of a tax collector in 1992. After the attack at Jones's office, Ashman was charged with manslaughter and attempted murder, but the jury at his trial found him to be mentally unfit to stand trial. He was detained in Broadmoor for observation, and the Home Office authorised a further trial in September 2002. He was subsequently found guilty of attempted murder, and he admitted to Pennington's manslaughter on the grounds of diminished responsibility in 2003.

Pennington was posthumously awarded the George Medal for his attempts to protect Jones.

Peerage
On 13 May 2005, it was announced that Jones would be created a life peer, and he was subsequently elevated to the peerage on 20 June 2005 as Baron Jones of Cheltenham, of Cheltenham in the County of Gloucestershire. As well as many outside interests, he acted as a non-executive consultant for BFC Marcomms Ltd, a Wiltshire-based public relations consultancy.

Personal life and death
Jones married Katherine Grinnell in 1981 at the British Embassy, Abu Dhabi. They had a son, Sam, and twin daughters, Amy and Lucy. Jones died during heart surgery on 7 November 2022, at the age of 74.

Arms

In popular culture
In Official Secrets, a 2019 British-American docudrama film, Jones is portrayed by Chris Larkin.

References

External links 

 
 Lord Jones of Cheltenham profile at the site of Liberal Democrats
 Cheltenham Liberal Democrats
 Guardian Politics Ask Aristotle – Nigel Jones
 TheyWorkForYou.com – Nigel Jones
 The Public Whip – Nigel Jones voting record
 BBC News – Nigel Jones profile 10 February 2005
 PR consultancy.

1948 births
2022 deaths
Liberal Democrats (UK) MPs for English constituencies
Jones of Cheltenham
Councillors in Gloucestershire
People from Cheltenham
People from Evesham
UK MPs 1992–1997
UK MPs 1997–2001
UK MPs 2001–2005
English computer programmers
Stabbing survivors
Liberal Democrats (UK) councillors
Politics of Cheltenham
Attacks on British politicians
Life peers created by Elizabeth II
Place of death missing
UK MPs who were granted peerages